Craig Edward DeForest (born August 13, 1968) is an American solar physicist and the Chair of the American Astronomical Society's Solar Physics Division.  He leads the heliophysics research group at the Boulder, Colorado offices of the Southwest Research Institute and holds an adjunct faculty position at the University of Colorado, Boulder.  His wide-ranging contributions to the field of experimental astrophysics of the Sun include: early work on the MSSTA, a sounding rocket that prototyped modern normal-incidence EUV optics such as are used on the Solar Dynamics Observatory; his discovery of sound waves in the solar corona in 1998; standardization of computer vision techniques that are used to measure and track magnetic fields on the solar surface; co-invention with colleague Charles Kankelborg of the fluxon semi-Lagrangian approach to numerical MHD modeling; and pioneering work on quantitative remote sensing of the solar wind via Thomson scattered light.

DeForest is noted outside the heliophysics science community for his contributions to open-source software, in particular PDL and Audacity; and for his extensive work on science outreach to the public.

DeForest is the Principal Investigator of the planned PUNCH mission launching in 2025 to study the solar corona and the origin of the solar wind.

References

1968 births
Living people
American astrophysicists
University of Colorado Boulder faculty
Reed College alumni
Stanford University alumni